{{Infobox television
| image                = Allsang pa Skansen 2004-07-20.jpg
| caption              = Allsång på Skansen on 20 July 2004
| genre                =
| creator              = 
| developer            = 
| presenter            = Pernilla Wahlgren
| starring             = 
| voices               = 
| narrated             = 
| theme_music_composer = Lasse Berghagen (Stockholm i mitt hjärta)Bengt Haslum (Sjung med, sjung med, per television, så blir vi en enad nation!)
| opentheme            = Stockholm i mitt hjärta (1994–present)Sjung med, sjung med, per television, så blir vi en enad nation! (1979–93)
| endtheme             = 
| composer             = 
| country              = Sweden
| language             = Swedish
| num_seasons          = 
| num_episodes         = 
| list_episodes        = 
| producer             = 
| executive_producer   = 
| location             = Skansen, Stockholm Fredriksten, Sarpsborg
| camera               = 
| runtime              = 60 minutes
| network              = SVT1
| picture_format       = 576i (1979–2006)720p (2007–)
| audio_format         = Dolby Digital 5.1 (2003–)
| first_aired          = 
| last_aired           = 
| related              =  
}}Allsång på Skansen (Sing-along at Skansen) is a Swedish show held at Skansen, Stockholm, every summer on Tuesdays between 8pm and 9pm. The audience is encouraged to sing along with musical guest stars to well-known Swedish and international songs. The show started in 1935 on a small scale; about 50 people in the audience. Today, about 10,000–25,500 people come to each performance.

Since 3 August 1979 the show has been broadcast by Sveriges Television. Initially the show had about 300,000 viewers. When Lasse Berghagen took over as host, the ratings increased to about 2 million viewers. In 2003, Allsång på Skansen was the first SVT programme that was broadcast with 5.1 multichannel sound. In 2007, it became one of the first Swedish live programmes broadcast in high-definition television. Although the show is scheduled to run for 90 minutes, only one hour of it is broadcast on SVT1 but viewers can watch the entire show on SVT Play.

Hosts
1935–1950: Sven Lilja (deceased 1951)
1956–1966: Egon Kjerrman (on Swedish Radio as Siste Man På Skansen)
1974–1993: Bosse Larsson
1994–2003: Lasse Berghagen
2004–2010: Anders Lundin (also 2003)
2011–2013: Måns Zelmerlöw
2014–2015: Petra Marklund
2016–2022: Sanna Nielsen
2023–    : Pernilla Wahlgren
The guest who has appeared on the show the most is Robert Gustavsson, who has appeared 13 times.

Guest appearances

2005
 28 June: Magnus Uggla, Darin Zanyar, Lena Philipsson and Sven-Bertil Taube.
 5 July: Lasse Berghagen, Lill-Babs, Alcazar, Rigmor Gustavsson, Lina Nyberg och Viktoria Tolstoy.
 12 July: Carola, Jan Malmsjö, Elena Paparizou, Eva Eastwood and Daniel Andersson.
 19 July: Christer Sjögren, Caroline Wennergren and Diggiloo (Elisabeth Andreassen, Lotta Engberg, Jessica Andersson and Agneta Sjödin).
 26 July: Håkan Hellström, Mats Paulsson, Rhapsody In Rock (Robert Wells, Peter Jöback, Shirley Clamp, Nanne Grönvall and Gunilla Backman) and Amy Diamond.
 2 August: Tommy Nilsson, The Real Group and Benny Anderssons Orkester with Tommy Körberg and Helen Sjöholm.
 9 August: Louise Hoffsten, Eva Dahlgren, Magnus Härenstam and Brasse Brännström.

2006

 27 June: Tomas Ledin, Elias featuring Frans, Povel Ramel, Orphei Drängar, and Sebastian Karlsson.
 4 July: Carola, Andreas Johnson, Carl-Anton, Sofia Karlsson, and I'm from Barcelona.
 11 July: Håkan Hellström, Björn Kjellman, Katarina Fallholm, Bolibompabandet, and secret guest Lasse Lönndahl.
 18 July: Lordi, Sven-Ingvars, Patrik Isaksson, and Laila Adéle.
 25 July: Eric Gadd, Bröderna Trück, Agnes Carlsson, and Orup.
 1 August: Lill Lindfors, Björn Skifs, Charlotte Perrelli, and Robert Gustafsson.

2007

 26 June: The Ark, Pernilla Wahlgren, Benjamin Wahlgren, Maia Hirasawa, Electric Banana Band with Riltons Vänner, and Maria Möller.
 3 July: Per Gessle, Måns Zelmerlöw, Frida Öhrn, Bengan Janson, Kalle Moraeus, Patrik Isaksson, Sussie Eriksson, and Henrik Dorsin.
 10 July: Jerry Williams, Lasse Berghagen, Lasse Holm, Salem Al Fakir, Roland Cedermark, Tobias Blom, Sofia Lockwall, and Gabriella Lockwall.
 17 July: Eldkvarn, Svante Thuresson, Sofia Karlsson, Markoolio, Mattias Enn, Florence Valentin.
 24 July: Peter Jöback, Marie Lindberg, M.A. Numminen, Amy Diamond, Sahara Hotnights, Kjerstin Dellert.
 31 July: E-Type, Fredrik Lycke, Alexander Lycke, Tomas von Brömssen, Marija Šerifović, Arne Qvick, Hanna Jämteby.
 7 August: Benny Anderssons orkester (BAO), Nanne Grönvall, Robert Broberg, and Robert Gustafsson & Elias Andersson.

2008
 24 June: Håkan Hellström, Arja Saijonmaa, Christer Sjögren, Miss Li, Bosse Parnevik, and Towa Carson.
 1 July: Magnus Uggla, Sanna Nielsen, Peter Jöback, Eva Dahlgren, E.M.D., and Anton Zetterholm.
 8 July: Lasse Stefanz, Amanda Jenssen, Brolle, 50 years of rock'n'roll (Little Gerhard, Rock-Olga, Rock-Ragge and Burken), and Maria Haukaas Storeng.
 15 July: The Poodles, Torgny "Kingen" Karlsson, Rigmor Gustafsson & Christina Gustafsson, Wei Wei, and Owe Thörnqvist.
 22 July: Adam Tensta, Andra Generationen, Veronica Maggio, Peter Harryson, Beata Harryson, and Vocal Six.
 29 July: BWO, Abalone Dots, and Nina Söderquist.
 5 August: Benny Anderssons orkester, Divine. Charlott Strandberg, Gunilla Backman, Sussie Eriksson, Tobias Ahlsell, Therese Löf-Amberg, Sara Dahlgren, Robin Olsson, Jesper Sjölander, Martin Redhe Nordh, Anna Andersson, Cecila Skarby, Robert Gustafsson,[Annika Sjöö, Helen Sjöholm, and Tommy Körberg

2009
23 June: Måns Zelmerlöw, Tomas Ledin, Henrik Dorsin, Anna Maria Espinosa, and Owe Thörnqvist.
30 June: A Camp, Malena Ernman, Lisa Ekdahl, Johan Palm, Ann-Louise Hanson, and Mia Skäringer.
7 July: Magnus Uggla, Caroline af Ugglas, John ME, Claes Eriksson, Anne-Lie Rydé & Lotta Ramel, and Rolandz.
14 July: Alexander Rybak, Larz Kristerz, Marcus Birro, Elisabeth Andreassen, Pauline, Anna Book, and Stockholms Gosskör.
21 July: Lars Vegas Trio, Lili & Susie, Monica & Carl-Axel Dominique, Wille Crafoord, Magnus Carlsson, Jack Vreeswijk, Jonas Karlsson, and Kevin Borg.
28 July: After Dark, Malena Tuvung, Timo Räisänen, Per Myrberg, Glada Hudik-teatern, H.E.A.T., and Miss Li.
4 August: Svenska Lyxorkestern, Allmänna Sången, Markus Krunegård, Bosse Larsson, Lasse Berghagen, Björn Skifs, Sylvia Vrethammar, and Peter Lundblad.

2010
29 June: The Ark, MozART group Anna Bergendahl, Robert Broberg, and Carola.
6 July: The Playtones, Marie Kühler, Eric Saade, Marie Bergman, Mikael Wiehe, The Ten Tenors, Wille Craaford and Marika Willstedt.
13 July: Cotton Eye Joe Show, Darin, Timoteij, Movits!, Olivia Stevens, Kikki Danielsson.
20 July: Salem Al Fakir, Gunhild Carling, Drängarna, The Real Group, Thomas Di Leva, Oskar Linnros.
27 July: Mando Diao, Jonas Gardell, Christer Sjögren, Thorsten Flinck, Jasmine Kara, Lill Lindfors, and Idolerna.
3 August: The Baseballs, Huutajat, Jakob Hellman, Kjerstin Dellert, and Gösta Linderholm.
10 August: Jerry Williams, Ola Forssmed, Tove Styrke, Orup, Hanna Lindblad, Charlotte Perrelli and Magnus Carlsson.
17 August: Swedish Radio Symphony Orchestra, Måns Zelmerlöw and Lisette Pagler, Sarah Dawn Finer, Magnus Uggla, Fredrik Lycke and Jocke Bergström.

2011
28 June: Benny Anderssons Orkester, Lund Student Singers, Danny Saucedo, September, and Helen Sjöholm.
5 July: Håkan Hellström, Miriam Aïd, Siw Malmkvist, Ulrik Munther, The Moniker, and Hasse Andersson.
12 July: Veronica Maggio, Elisa's, Eric Amarillo, Sara Varga, Kjell Lönnå, Per Andersson, and Häxan Surtant.
19 July: Malena Ernman, Bo Kaspers Orkester, After Shave and Anders Eriksson, Petter, Vocalettes, Pernilla Andersson, and Lena-Maria Klingvall.
26 July: Hoffmaestro, Marika Willstedt and Angelica Alm, Carl Norén, Östen med Resten, Caroline Wennergren, and Eric Saade.
2 August: Timbuktu, Eva Eastwood, Patriks Combo, Hans-Erik Dyvik Husby, Fredrik Kempe, and Svante Thuresson.
9 August: Lena Philipsson, Sven-Ingvars, Staffan Percy, Albin Flinkas and Fredrik Meyer.
16 August: Swedish Radio Symphony Orchestra and Anders Berglund, Björn Skifs, Loa Falkman, and Peter Jöback.

2012 

26 June: Adolf Fredrik's Girls' Choir, Agnes, Laleh, Magnus Uggla & Edith Backlund, and Sean Banan.
3 July: Basshunter, Dead by April, Erik Hassle, Molly Sandén, Pros & Cons, and Gunwer Bergkvist.
10 July: Bengt Sändh, Christina Lindberg, Diggiloo, Lasse Stefanz, Loreen, and Norlie & KKV.
17 July: Andreas Weise, Björn Ranelid & Sara Li, Herreys, Markus Krunegård, and Miss Li.
24 July: Amanda Fondell, Christer Björkman, Fibes, Oh Fibes!, Hagsätra Sport, Sten and Stanley, Tomas Ledin, and Icona Pop.
31 July: Darin, Linnea Henriksson, Monica Nielsen & Monica Dominique.
7 August: Cookies 'N' Beans, Panetoz, The Soundtrack of Our Lives, and Thorsten Flinck.
14 August: Gina Dirawi, Jerry Williams, Peter Lundblad, Petra Mede & Anna Granath, and Sarah Dawn Finer.

2013 
 25 June: Gyllene Tider, Zara Larsson, Passenger, Carola, and Eric Ericsons Kammarkör.
 2 July: Oskar Linnros, Amanda Jenssen, Lisa Nilsson, Yohio, Per Andersson, Kjerstin Dellert, and Peter Jezewski.
 9 July: Håkan Hellström, Louise Hoffsten, Anton Ewald, Grynet Molvig, and Skansen's Ukulele Orchestra.
 16 July: Miriam Bryant, Rikard Wolff, Danny Saucedo, and Arvingarna.
 23 July: Magnus Uggla, B.U.S!, Robin Stjernberg, Rolandz, Brynolf & Ljung, and Nic Schröder.
 30 July: The Sounds, Kalle Moraeus, Sean Banan, Jonas Gardell, Lisa Miskovsky, Tensta Gospel Choir, and Trio me' Bumba.
 6 August: Petter, Petra Marklund, Sofia Jannok, Lill-Babs
 13 August: Mando Diao, Kim Cesarion, Flying Bach, Arja Saijonmaa, Edda Magnason

2014 
 24 June: Ace Wilder & Mariette Hansson, Niklas Strömstedt & Eric Bazilian, Malena Ernman & Loa Falkman, James Blunt, and Albin featuring Kristin Amparo & Mattias Andréasson.
 1 July: Markus Krunegård, Nina Persson, Sanna Nielsen, Gunhild Carling, Seinabo Sey, and Jany Schella.
 8 July: Elisas, The Fooo, Björn Skifs, Linda Pira, and Jon Henrik Fjällgren.
 15 July: Laleh, Jill Johnson & Doug Seegers, Annika Herlitz, The Real Group, Ison & Fille.
 22 July: Electric Banana Band, Darin, Titiyo, and Vera Nord.
 29 July: Weeping Willows, Ola Salo, Alcazar, Panetoz, and Stefan Nilsson & Anna Stadling & Lidingö Motettkör.
 5 August: Takida, Orup, Linnea Henriksson, Timbuktu, and John de Sohn
 12 August: Jenny Wilson, Icona Pop, John Martin, and Lise & Gertrud.

2015 
 23 June: Carola, Hasse Andersson, Panetoz
 30 June: Norlie & KKV, Måns Zelmerlöw, Sabina Ddumba, Tomas Ledin
 7 July: Bo Kaspers Orkester, Danny Saucedo, Isa, Jill Johnson & Doug Seegers, Magnus Carlsson
 14 July: Darin, Jakob Karlberg, Titti Sjöblom, Zara Larsson, Brolle & Nanne Grönvall
 21 July: Dinah Nah, Ida LaFontaine, Kjell Lönnå & Sundsvalls Kammarkör, Lasse Stefanz & Mikael Wiehe, Ulrik Munther
 28 July: Alcazar, Gunilla Backman, Jessica Andersson & Charlotte Perrelli, Svante Thuresson & Pernilla Andersson, Viktor Olsson, IJustWantToBeCool
 4 August: Cajsa Stina Åkerström, Christina Nilsson, Bruno Mitsogiannis, Peter Johansson, David Lindgren, Robert Rydberg, Petter, Say Lou Lou
 11 August: Sveriges Radios Symfoniorkester, Lena Philipsson, Tommy Körberg, Rigmor Gustafsson & Viktoria Tolstoy, Robert Noack & Maria Ylipää

2016
 28 June: BAO, Frans and Miriam Bryant.
 5 July: Lisa Nilsson, Daniel Adams-Ray, Malena Ernman and Oscar Zia.
 12 July: Laleh, Marcus & Martinus, Daniel Norberg, Niklas Strömstedt and Elin Rombo.
 19 July: SaRaha, Anders Glenmark, Josefin Johansson, Orup, Solala and Sonja Aldén.
 26 July: Veronica Maggio, Jamala and Smith & Thell.
 2 August: LÉON, Martin Stenmarck, Ola Aurell and Systerpolskan.
 9 August: Maria Andersson, Sten & Stanley, Bob Hund and Lill-Babs.
 16 August: Zara Larsson, Lill Lindfors and John Lundvik, Frances and Tensta Gospel Choir.

2022
 19 July: Sahara Hotnights.

See also

Sommarkrysset
Lotta på Liseberg, a sing-along show held in Gothenburg, Sweden
Allsang på grensen, an inspired Norwegian TV-show held in Halden, Norway that premiered in the summer of 2007.

References

External links

Broadcastings at SVT's open archive
Allsång på Skansen on Sveriges Television's website
Allsång på Skansen on Skansen's website

Sveriges Television original programming
Swedish music television series
Recurring events established in 1935
Music in Stockholm
Skansen
1979 Swedish television series debuts
1993 Swedish television series endings
1970s Swedish television series
1980s Swedish television series
1990s Swedish television series
Music festivals established in 1935
Summer events in Sweden
Sing-along